The Piura Metropolitan Area is the name used to refer to the metropolitan area whose principal city is Piura, located in northern Peru. According to "Concerted development plan Piura 2009–2014" the districts of Piura, Veintiséis de Octubre, Castilla and Catacaos of Piura Province currently are consolidated into a metropolitan area to act with the same urban, industrial and commercial plan. It is one of the most populous metropolitan area of Peru in year 2015.

Urban development plan 
The  "Urban development plan of Piura, Castilla y Catacaos 2032" was approved with the document "N° 122-00-CMPP" in December 2012, however it was repealed with the document "N° 122-01-CMPP" on 18 March 2013, and by now is in force the "Director Plan of Piura and Castilla" until the publication of the new Urban development plan of Piura, Castilla y Catacaos.

Population of metropolitan districts
According to Regulator Plan of transportation Routes of the city the metropolis of Piura is the conurbation of Piura, Castilla and Catacaos. According to INEI the population of the districts of Piura metropolitan area is as follows:

See also 
 Piura Province
 List of metropolitan areas of Peru
 Peru

References

Metropolitan areas of Peru